Ville Iiskola (born 26 April 1985) is a Finnish football player currently playing for RoPS.

References
Veikkausliiga Hall of Fame
Guardian Football

1985 births
Living people
People from Jaala
Finnish footballers
Veikkausliiga players
Turun Palloseura footballers
Kuopion Palloseura players
Myllykosken Pallo −47 players
Association football goalkeepers
Sportspeople from Kymenlaakso